Neo Samuel Maneng is a South African politician from the Northern Cape. He is the chief whip of the African National Congress (ANC) caucus in the Northern Cape Provincial Legislature. He was elected to the legislature in May 2019. He is also the former provincial secretary of the African National Congress Youth League (ANCYL). Maneng is seen as someone who is aligned to former premier Sylvia Lucas.

References

External links
Neo Samuel Maneng – People's Assembly
Profile : Mr Neo Samuel Maneng – NCPLEG

Living people
South African politicians
African National Congress politicians
Members of the Northern Cape Provincial Legislature
1980 births